Arthur Rex Dugard Fairburn (2 February 1904 – 25 March 1957), commonly known by his initials A. R. D. Fairburn and otherwise as Rex,  was a New Zealand poet who was born and died in Auckland.

Fairburn was born in Auckland in 1904. His grandfather, the surveyor, thinker and traveller Edwin Fairburn, was one of the first Pākehā born in New Zealand in 1827. His great-grandfather, William Thomas Fairburn, had come to New Zealand as a missionary for the New Zealand Church Missionary Society in 1819.

Fairburn attended Auckland Grammar School, where he first met R. A. K. Mason, and worked at various jobs, including relief work on the roads. Later he tutored in English and lectured on the history and theory of Art at Elam School of Art, Auckland University College. His poetry was initially influenced by the (then unfashionable) Georgian poets.

Works
He Shall Not Rise [1930]
Dominion (1938) 
Poems 1929–41
Walking on My Feet (1945)
Strange Rendezview (1952)
Three Poems including Dominion, The Voyage, To a Friend in the Wilderness (1952) 
plus satirical and light verse including:
The Sky is a Limpet (A Polytickle Parrotty)
How to Ride a Bicycle (In Seventeen Lovely Colours) 
The Rakehelly Man
Poetry Harbinger
"Reverie on the Rat"
"Rhyme of the Dead Self"

References

External links
Biography in the 1966 Encyclopaedia of New Zealand
Interview with A.R.D Fairburn's daughters Dinah Holman and Janis Fairburn about their father for Cultural Icons project. Audio.
Poems in Kowhai Gold (1930)

1883 births
1957 deaths
People educated at Auckland Grammar School
New Zealand male poets
Academic staff of the University of Auckland
20th-century New Zealand poets
20th-century New Zealand male writers
Fairburn–Newman family